The Keithsburg Bridge was a vertical lift bridge that carried a single railroad track across the Mississippi River between Louisa County, Iowa and Keithsburg, Illinois.

The bridge was constructed for the Minneapolis and St. Louis Railway in 1909 and traffic across the bridge was discontinued in 1971 by then owner Chicago and North Western, who had purchased the M&StL in 1960. After the line was abandoned, the vertical lift was locked in the up position for several years until the lift portion was accidentally destroyed by fireworks and the ensuing fire on June 21, 1981. The  vertical lift section fell into the river blocking barge traffic on the main channel of the Mississippi River for more than a week until it was removed by the US Army Corps of Engineers. The USGS aerial photo from March 2000, and satellite mapping views taken since then, show the bridge standing but missing its vertical lift section.

This bridge replaced a previous Iowa Central railroad bridge, constructed in 1886 by the Phoenix Bridge Company, that crossed at the same location. As of 2014, the old stone piers from the previous bridge were still standing next to the current bridge.

See also
List of crossings of the Upper Mississippi River

References

External links
Keithsburg Railroad Bridge - John Weeks

Bridges over the Mississippi River
Railroad bridges in Illinois
Railroad bridges in Iowa
Truss bridges in the United States
Vertical lift bridges in Illinois
Vertical lift bridges in the United States
1909 establishments in Illinois
Buildings and structures in Louisa County, Iowa
Buildings and structures in Mercer County, Illinois
1909 establishments in Iowa
Interstate railroad bridges in the United States